"Rwanda Rwacu" was the national anthem of Rwanda from 1962 to January 1, 2002, when it was replaced with "Rwanda Nziza".

History
It was replaced on January 1, 2002, a few years after the Rwandan genocide.

Lyrics

References

External links
http://david.national-anthems.net/index.html

Historical national anthems
Rwandan music
National symbols of Rwanda
African anthems
National anthem compositions in F major